The China National Opera House (CNOH) or China Central Opera (中央歌剧院) is a State-run opera company based in Beijing, China, and under the Chinese Ministry of Culture. CNOH consists of an opera troupe, a choir, a symphony orchestra and a stagecraft, costume and scenery departments. It is affiliated, through common direction under the Ministry of Culture, with the Shanghai Opera House company and other geju companies around China.

History
The China Central Opera was preceded in Yan'an in 1942 with the performance of the Yangko drama (秧歌剧) Brothers and Sisters Opening up the Wasteland (《兄妹开荒》), and the White-Haired Girl. The opera troupe relocated to Beijing in 1952 and was officially established in 1952 as the national opera company directly under the Ministry of Culture.

Building

The administrative offices, practice rooms and a rehearsal theatre, often referred to as the "Central National Opera House," are located at Chaoyangmen Outer Street Dongzhong-jie 115, south-east of Dongsi Shitiao Station in West Beijing, however since the opening of the National Centre for the Performing Arts at Tiananmen Square East, performances at the permanent theatre of the Opera company are rare. The company instead performs in larger theatres around China, including the Shanghai Oriental Art Centre, supplies opera singers to television stations and for concert performances, and tours abroad.

Productions in China
CNOH staged La Boheme in Beijing in 1986 with Luciano Pavarotti and later Turandot in the Forbidden City. Then in June 2001 came the successful Three Tenors Forbidden City Concert. In 2009, CNOH staged Turandot with Zhang Yimou in the "Bird's Nest" Beijing National Stadium, and again in the Taichung Intercontinental Baseball Stadium in Taiwan.

Tours abroad
CNOH has toured abroad since its conception, first in socialist countries, then in the west. In 1988 CNOH was guest company at the Savonlinna Opera Festival performing Carmen, Madam Butterfly, Verdi's Requiem as well as Chinese-language opera. In 2008 CNOH toured America with 10 performances of the original creation Farewell My Concubine (modern opera). In the same year CNOH performed Puccini’s Turandot in Cairo Opera House.

Repertoire
The repertoire of the company has now expanded to "Madame Butterfly, Eugene Onegin (opera), Carmen (opera), La Traviata,  Gianni Schicchi, Turandot, Aida, La Boheme, Rigoletto, The Marriage of Figaro, Otello Cavalleria Rusticana, The Barber of Seville Les Contes d'Hoffmann, Le Roi d'Ys, as well as Chinese-language western-style operas, such as Liu Hulan (opera), Song of the Grasslands, Ayiguli, The Hundredth Bride, Marco Polo (opera), Du Shiniang, Farewell My Concubine, Countryside Girl Teacher, The Love Story of Rawap 2009 and Revolution in 1911 2011, staged in Macau.

People
Presidents of CNOH include Li Bozhao, Zhou Weizhi, Lu Su, Zhao Feng, composer Ma Ke, Li Ling, Liu Lianchi, Wang Shiguang, Chen Xieyang and Liu Xijin. Conductor Yu Feng is the current president. Notable singers of the company, past and present include Yuan Chenye, baritone.

References

External links
 China National Opera House website

Chinese opera companies
Theatre companies in Beijing
Music of Beijing
1942 establishments in China
Musical groups established in 1942